CMA CGM Jules Verne (IMO 9454450) is an Explorer-class container ship built for CMA CGM. It was originally named after Chinese admiral and explorer Zheng He, but CMA CGM renamed it after the French writer Jules Verne. She is among the world's largest containerships, at 16,020 TEU.

Specifications
Length overall: 396 m
Beam: 51 m
Speed: 24 knots
Capacity: 16,020 TEU.
Engine: 14RT-Flex96C low speed diesel, 80,080 kW

References

Container ships
Jules Verne
Jules Verne
Ships built by Daewoo Shipbuilding & Marine Engineering
2013 ships